The Federal Territories in Malaysia comprise three territories—Kuala Lumpur, Labuan, and Putrajaya—governed directly by the Federal Government of Malaysia. Kuala Lumpur is the national capital of Malaysia, Putrajaya is the administrative capital, and Labuan is an offshore international financial centre. Kuala Lumpur and Putrajaya are enclaves in the state of Selangor, while Labuan is an island off the coast of Sabah.

Administrations
The territories fall under the jurisdiction of the Ministry for the Federal Territories. Originally the Federal Territory Ministry was established in 1979 and was in charge of planning and administration of Kuala Lumpur and Klang Valley. In 1981, the FT Ministry has been re-established under the Prime Minister's Office which acts as the Planning Unit of Klang Valley. In 2004, FT Ministry is then again formed into a full-fledged ministry which focuses on the development of Kuala Lumpur, Labuan and Putrajaya.In 2022,under Anwar Ibrahim's administrstion, the ministry was scrapped and its functions has been merged with other ministries. Currently, the Federal Territories are administered by the Department of the Federal Territories (Jabatan Wilayah Persekutuan) under the Prime Minister's Office.

History
The federal territories were originally part of two states - Selangor and Sabah. Both Kuala Lumpur and Putrajaya were part of Selangor, while Labuan was part of Sabah.

Kuala Lumpur, the state capital of Selangor, became the national capital of the Federation of Malaya (and later Malaysia) in 1948. Since independence in 1957, the federal as well as the Selangor state ruling party had been the Alliance (later the Barisan Nasional). However, in the 1969 elections the Alliance, while retaining control of the federal government, lost its majority in Selangor to the opposition. The same election also resulted in a major race riot in Kuala Lumpur.

It was realised that if Kuala Lumpur remained part of Selangor, clashes between the federal and the Selangor state government might arise when they are controlled by different parties. The solution was to separate Kuala Lumpur from the state and place it under direct federal rule. On 1 February 1974, the Federal Territory of Kuala Lumpur Agreement was signed, and Kuala Lumpur became the first federal territory of Malaysia.

The cession of Kuala Lumpur had the effect of securing the Selangor state government for the Barisan Nasional until the 2008 general election. The separation of Kuala Lumpur meant that Kuala Lumpur voters lost representation in the Selangor State Legislative Assembly and could only vote for representation in the Parliament of Malaysia.

Labuan, an island off coast of mainland Sabah, was chosen by the federal government for development into an offshore financial centre. Labuan became the second federal territory in 16 April 1984.

Putrajaya is a planned city, designed to replace Kuala Lumpur as the seat of the federal government. Sultan Salahuddin, who was serving as the Yang di-Pertuan Agong at that time, was asked again to cede land to the federal government. Putrajaya became the third federal territory on 1 February 2001.

In the recent years, efforts were made to forge a common identity for the three federal territories. A flag of Federal Territory was introduced to represent the federal territories as a whole. During the 2006 Sukma Games in Kedah, Kuala Lumpur, Labuan and Putrajaya merged into the unified contingent of Federal Territories.

Symbols

Maju dan Sejahtera is the official anthem of the Federal Territories.

Apart from the flag of Federal Territories, each federal territory has its own individual flag.

Sports
Sport activities in all the three Federal Territories are governed and coordinated by the Federal Territory Sports Council (WIPERS), a federal statutory body.

Holidays

In addition to Federal public holidays, all three Federal Territories celebrates Federal Territory Day. Labuan, with a significant Kadazan-Dusun community, celebrates Kaamatan with the neighbouring state of Sabah.

Federal Parliament Seats 
List of Federal Territories representatives in the Federal Parliament (Dewan Rakyat) since the 15th general election:

References

External links

 Malaysian Ministry of Federal Territories